The 2013 Città di Como Challenger was a professional tennis tournament played on clay courts. It was the eight edition of the tournament which was part of the 2013 ATP Challenger Tour. It took place in Como, Italy between 26 August and 1 September 2013.

Singles main draw entrants

Seeds

 1 Rankings are as of August 19, 2013.

Other entrants
The following players received wildcards into the singles main draw:
  Andrea Arnaboldi
  Marco Crugnola
  Alessandro Giannessi
  Gianluca Naso

The following players received entry as an alternate into the singles main draw:
  Enrique López Pérez
  Taro Daniel

The following players received entry from the qualifying draw:
  Moritz Baumann
  Ilija Bozoljac
  Lorenzo Giustino
  Mate Pavić

The following players received entry as an lucky loser into the singles main draw:
  Mate Delić

Champions

Singles

 Pablo Carreño Busta def.  Dominic Thiem 6–2, 5–7, 6–0

Doubles

 Rameez Junaid /  Igor Zelenay def.  Marco Crugnola /  Stefano Ianni 7–5, 7–6(7–2)

External links
Official Website

Citta di Como Challenger
Città di Como Challenger
Città di Como Challenger
Città di Como Challenger
Città di Como Challenger